Ronald Dayne (born March 14, 1978) is a former professional American football running back who played in the National Football League (NFL) for eight seasons.  Dayne played college football for the University of Wisconsin and won the 1999 Heisman Trophy. He was a first round pick of the New York Giants in the 2000 NFL Draft and also played for the Denver Broncos and Houston Texans during his 7-year NFL career.

Bowl game statistics included, Dayne is the all-time leader in rushing yards in NCAA Division I FBS history, with 7,125 yards (Official stats exclude Bowl Games played before 2002.  Without Bowl game stats, Dayne is second all-time behind Donnel Pumphrey).

Early years
When Dayne was a child, his parents divorced, and he was sent to live with relatives. Due to a lack of reliable adult relatives, Dayne was forced to take on a parental role to his younger sister when he was just ten years old.  His athleticism and speed made him a star running back at Overbrook High School in his hometown of Pine Hill, New Jersey, and he was heavily recruited by many colleges. He also excelled at track and field. In 1995, he won the New Jersey Meet of Champions, setting a new meet record in the discus throw. In 1996, he won state titles in both the shot put and discus, breaking both meet records.  He won the Meet of Champions in both events and breaking his own meet record in the discus. He has the fifth-best distance ever thrown in the discus by a U.S. high school athlete at 216 feet, 11 inches (66.12m).

His football role was expected to change when he reached college. At 270 pounds out of high school, many felt that he was too big to be a tailback and believed he would be best suited as a fullback. Eventually, coach Barry Alvarez promised Dayne a tailback position and persuaded him to come to play for Wisconsin.

College career

He attended the University of Wisconsin-Madison, where he played for the Wisconsin Badgers football team from 1996 to 1999.  Known as the "Great Dayne" and "The Dayne Train" throughout college, Dayne was the starting running back all four years at Wisconsin and had 1,220 carries during his career.

Over his four seasons, Dayne set the NCAA Division I-A rushing record for total yards in a career.  He gained 1,863 yards as a freshman, 1,421 as a sophomore, 1,325 as a junior, and 1,834 as a senior.  He broke the record in the final game of the 1999 season against Iowa.  Dayne ended his career with 6,397 rushing yards (which does not include yardage from the four bowl games he played in), eclipsing the record set the previous year by Ricky Williams of Texas. The record has since been eclipsed by San Diego State back Donnel Pumphrey.

Dayne excelled in three bowl games for Wisconsin.  He rushed for 246 to lead the Badgers to a 38–10 victory in the 1996 Copper Bowl against Utah, garnering MVP honors.  Dayne only gained 36 yards in the 1998 Outback Bowl loss against Georgia the next season, but bounced back the next two seasons with 246 yards and 200 yards, respectively, in the Badgers' 1999 and 2000 Rose Bowl wins.  Dayne won MVP honors in both games, becoming only the third player in the history of the Rose Bowl to repeat as MVP — and the first and still only Big Ten player to do so.  Bob Schloredt (Washington/AAWU), Charles White (USC/Pac-10) were the first two, and Vince Young (Texas/Big 12) has subsequently accomplished this feat.

Dayne won the Heisman Trophy in 1999 as well as other awards throughout college, including Big Ten Player of the Year for 1999 and All-American placement in 1996, 1998 and 1999. His name and number is one of six displayed on the Camp Randall Stadium façade. Dayne's #33 was officially retired during the November 10, 2007, game against Michigan.

, Dayne's 6,397 career yards is second in the Division I-A (now FBS) career rushing list, trailing only Donnel Pumphrey  of San Diego State.  When yardage from bowl games is included, he amassed 7,125 yards. He shares the record for most 200-yard rushing games with Ricky Williams and Marcus Allen, with twelve.  He is one of only eight players in NCAA history to rush for over a thousand yards in each of his four seasons.

Dayne was inducted into the University of Wisconsin-Madison's Athletic Hall Of Fame as part of the 2009 class alongside fellow NFL player Joe Panos and MLB pitcher Thornton Kipper. For his contribution to the Rose Bowl game, he was inducted into the Rose Bowl Hall of Fame on December 31, 2011. In 2013, Dayne was inducted into the College Football Hall of Fame.

College statistics

Professional career

Dayne was selected in the first round with the 11th overall pick of the 2000 NFL Draft by the New York Giants. In Dayne's first season he teamed up with Tiki Barber in the backfield to create the tandem known as "Thunder and Lightning," a combination of Dayne's power and Barber's speed. The Giants went on to play in Super Bowl XXXV. Over the next few years, Dayne's carries slowly diminished, with head coach Jim Fassel, who Dayne already had a contentious relationship with, growing increasingly disappointed with Dayne's lack of commitment to lose weight. Fassel reportedly also did not like Dayne's halfback running style, and tried to make him a goal line back. After Fassel was fired, Dayne shed 40 pounds and received a second chance under new head coach Tom Coughlin. After missing every game during the 2003 regular season due to injury, Dayne saw minimal playing time during the 2004 regular season. The Giants did not attempt to re-sign Dayne, and he later signed a one-year deal with the Denver Broncos for the 2005 season. He was re-signed in the 2006 offseason and named the starter, but fell on the depth chart as the pre-season went along and was cut on September 2, 2006. The Houston Texans claimed Dayne off waivers the following day.

As a member of the Houston Texans, Dayne rushed for 429 yards and five touchdowns in December 2006. In 2007, he filled in for the injured Ahman Green. Dayne did not play in the NFL after the 2007 season.

NFL career statistics

See also

 History of the New York Giants (1994–present)
 List of NCAA Division I FBS running backs with at least 50 career rushing touchdowns
 List of college football yearly rushing leaders

Footnotes

References

External links
 
 
 

1978 births
Living people
All-American college football players
American football running backs
Big Ten Athlete of the Year winners
College Football Hall of Fame inductees
Denver Broncos players
Heisman Trophy winners
Houston Texans players
New York Giants players
People from Pine Hill, New Jersey
Players of American football from New Jersey
Sportspeople from Camden County, New Jersey
Wisconsin Badgers football players